Foraker may refer to:

Places
Mount Foraker, Alaska
Foraker, Indiana, an unincorporated community
Foraker, Kentucky, an unincorporated community
Foraker, Ohio, an unincorporated community
Foraker, Oklahoma, a town

Other uses
Foraker (surname)
Foraker Act, United States federal law
Foraker Formation, a geologic formation of limestone and shale in Nebraska, Kansas, and Oklahoma